The "umbrella man", identified by the United States House Select Committee on Assassinations in 1978 as Louie Steven Witt, is a name given to a figure who appears in the Zapruder film, and several other films and photographs, near the Stemmons Freeway sign within Dealey Plaza during the assassination of United States President John F. Kennedy.

Witt is the subject of a 2011 documentary short, The Umbrella Man, by Errol Morris for The New York Times.

Speculation
A person popularly dubbed the "umbrella man" has been the object of much speculation, as he was the only person seen carrying, and opening, an umbrella on that sunny day. He was also one of the closest bystanders to President John F. Kennedy when Kennedy was first struck by a bullet. As Kennedy's limousine approached, the man opened up and lifted the umbrella high above his head, then spun or panned the umbrella from east to west (clockwise) as the president passed by him. In the aftermath of the assassination, the "umbrella man" sat down on the sidewalk next to another man ("Dark Complected Man") before getting up and walking towards the Texas School Book Depository. The fact that both men sat there so calmly after the shooting has raised suspicion.

Early speculation came from assassination researchers Josiah Thompson and Richard Sprague who noticed the open umbrella in a series of photographs. Thompson and Sprague suggested that the "umbrella man" may have been acting as a signaler of some kind, opening his umbrella to signal "go ahead" and then raising it to communicate "fire a second round" to other gunmen. The "umbrella man" is depicted as performing such a role in Oliver Stone's film JFK and The X-Files episode "Musings of a Cigarette Smoking Man."

Another theory proposed by conspiracy theorist Robert B. Cutler and endorsed by Colonel L. Fletcher Prouty is that the umbrella may have been used to fire a dart with a paralyzing agent at Kennedy to immobilize his muscles and make him a "sitting duck" for an assassination.

Journalist Penn Jones Jr was approached by someone who mentioned the name of Louie Steven Witt. When he was tracked down he barely wanted to interact with journalists but offered to testify before the HSCA. His statement of only holding up the umbrella did not reflect what he actually did at that moment as he was moving the umbrella during the moment of shooting.

An idea speculated by the HSCA is that the umbrella may have been held as a symbol of protest regarding the US government's failure to provide an "umbrella" of air support during the Bay of Pigs invasion.

The peculiar behaviour of the Dark Complected Man standing (and later sitting) next to him has raised speculation about their roles that day.

Identification
After an appeal to the public by the United States House Select Committee on Assassinations (HSCA), Louie Steven Witt came forward in 1978 and claimed to be the "umbrella man". He claimed to still have the umbrella and did not know he had been the subject of controversy. He said that he brought the umbrella simply to heckle Kennedy, whose father, Joseph, had been a supporter of the Nazi-appeasing British Prime Minister Neville Chamberlain. By waving a black umbrella, Chamberlain's trademark fashion accessory, Witt said he was protesting the Kennedy family appeasing Adolf Hitler before World War II. An umbrella had been used in cartoons in the 1930s to symbolize such appeasement, and Chamberlain often carried an umbrella. Kennedy, who wrote a thesis on appeasement while at Harvard, Why England Slept, might have recognized the symbolism of the umbrella. Black umbrellas had been used in connection with protests against the President before; at the time of the construction of the Berlin Wall, a group of schoolchildren from Bonn sent the White House an umbrella labeled Chamberlain.

Testifying before the HSCA, Witt said "I think if the Guinness Book of World Records had a category for people who were at the wrong place at the wrong time, doing the wrong thing, I would be No. 1 in that position, without even a close runner-up."

Witt died on November 17, 2014.

See also
Dark Complected Man
Black dog man
Badge Man
Three tramps
Babushka Lady

Notes

External links
 The JFK 100: The Umbrella Man
 JFK Assassination Home Page: The Umbrella Man in Dealey Plaza
 JFK Assassination Home Page: The Umbrella Man Shooting Darts in Dealey Plaza
 

Witnesses to the assassination of John F. Kennedy
1924 births
2014 deaths